Derevnya razyezda Ibragimovo (İbrahim razyezı) is a rural locality (a village) in Savaleyevsky Selsoviet, Karmaskalinsky District, Bashkortostan, Russia. The population was 48 as of 2010. There is 1 street.

Geography 
The village is located 23 km north of Karmaskaly (the district's administrative centre) by road. Savaleyevo is the nearest rural locality.

References 

Rural localities in Karmaskalinsky District